Events in the year 1115 in Norway.

Incumbents

 Monarchs – Eystein I Magnusson, Sigurd the Crusader, Olaf Magnusson (co-rulers)

Events

Arts and literature

Births

Deaths
22 December – Olaf Magnusson of Norway, King (born c. 1099).

References

Norway